Nélson Rosa Martins (born 8 December 1937), known as Nelsinho Rosa, is a Brazilian retired football coach and former player who played as a midfielder.

Career
Born in Rio de Janeiro, Rosa made his senior debut with Madureira before joining Flamengo in 1962. He retired in 1968, aged 31.

After retiring, Rosa worked as an assistant before being named manager of Desportiva Ferroviária in 1977. In 1980, he was appointed manager of Fluminense, leaving the club in the following year.

Rosa returned to Flu in 1985, leaving in the following year. In 1989, he took over Vasco da Gama, and led the side to a 1989 Série A winning campaign.

Rosa returned to Vasco in 1992, before moving abroad to take over the Saudi Arabia national team. He worked at the side in the 1992 King Fahd Cup and the 1992 AFC Asian Cup, before returning to his home country in 1993 to work at Fluminense for a third spell.

In 2002, Rosa was also a manager of first club Madureira for a brief period. In 2011, he returned to the side to work as a football consultant.

Honours

Player
Flamengo
Campeonato Carioca: 1963, 1965

Manager
Desportiva Ferroviária
Campeonato Capixaba: 1977

Fluminense
Campeonato Carioca: 1980, 1985

Al Ain
UAE Football League: 1983–84

Vasco da Gama
Campeonato Brasileiro Série A: 1989

References

1937 births
Living people
Footballers from Rio de Janeiro (city)
Brazilian footballers
Association football midfielders
Madureira Esporte Clube players
CR Flamengo footballers
Brazilian football managers
Campeonato Brasileiro Série A managers
Desportiva Ferroviária managers
Fluminense FC managers
Al Ain FC managers
CR Vasco da Gama managers
Saudi Arabia national football team managers
Madureira Esporte Clube managers
Brazilian expatriate football managers
Brazilian expatriate sportspeople in the United Arab Emirates
Brazilian expatriate sportspeople in Saudi Arabia
Expatriate football managers in Saudi Arabia
Expatriate football managers in the United Arab Emirates